The Amsterdam Metropolitan area is the city region around the city of Amsterdam, the capital of the Netherlands. It lies in the Noordvleugel (English: "North Wing") of the larger polycentric Randstad metropolitan area and encompasses the city of Amsterdam, the provinces of North Holland and Flevoland, as well as 36 further municipalities within the two provinces, with a total population of over 2.5 million inhabitants.

The administrative responsibility for the Amsterdam metropolitan area lies with the Amsterdam Metropolitan Area Central Administration (BKG).

Members 
 Provinces of North Holland and Flevoland
 Municipalities of Aalsmeer, Almere, Amstelveen, Amsterdam, Beemster, Beverwijk, Blaricum, Bloemendaal, Diemen, Edam-Volendam, Gooise Meren, Haarlem, Haarlemmermeer, Heemskerk, Heemstede, Hilversum, Huizen, Landsmeer, Laren, Lelystad, Oostzaan, Ouder-Amstel, Purmerend, Uitgeest, Uithoorn, Velsen, Waterland, Weesp, Wijdemeren, Wormerland, Zaanstad and Zandvoort

See also
 Randstad
 Haaglanden
 Rijnmond
 Drechtsteden
 Brabantse Stedenrij
 Metropoolregio Eindhoven
 City Region Arnhem Nijmegen

Notes

References

External links 
 Metropolitan Region Amsterdam (MRA)
 Amsterdam metropolitan area 2030, promotional flyer for the future development of the metro area, City of Amsterdam
 * Vervoerregio Amsterdam

Geography of Amsterdam
Metropolitan areas of the Netherlands
Regions of the Netherlands
Regions of North Holland